Philip Pinder (born 19 August 1964) is a Bahamian boxer. He competed in the men's light heavyweight event at the 1984 Summer Olympics.

References

1964 births
Living people
Bahamian male boxers
Olympic boxers of the Bahamas
Boxers at the 1984 Summer Olympics
Place of birth missing (living people)
Light-heavyweight boxers